Tapeina transversifrons is a species of beetle in the family Cerambycidae. It was described by James Thomson in 1857. It is known from Honduras, Costa Rica, Nicaragua, Guatemala, Mexico, Belize, Panama, El Salvador, and Venezuela.

Subspecies
 Tapeina transversifrons transversifrons Thomson, 1857
 Tapeina transversifrons brevifrons Chemsak & Linsley in Marinoni, 1972
 Tapeina transversifrons centralis Marinoni, 1972

References

Lamiinae
Beetles described in 1857